"Casino Boogie" is a song by English rock band the Rolling Stones, from their 1972 album, Exile on Main St. Written by Mick Jagger and Keith Richards, it was recorded at Villa Nellcote, Richards' home in the South of France. The song has a straightforward blues rhythm which produces the "boogie" feel. Richards' prominent backing vocals and Bobby Keys' saxophone solo are other features of the track.

Writing
Struggling to write lyrics for the song, Jagger wrote small, random phrases on torn pieces of paper. These were mixed up and then picked out one-by-one by the band members. The order of the lyrics on the record is the same order in which they were picked. The song was written in open G tuning with the capo at the second fret putting it into A. Its opening riff is never revisited through the rest of the song. After the last verse, the instrumental outro features a lengthy guitar solo from Mick Taylor till the fade out.

Release
"Casino Boogie" was not released as a single and has never been played live by the Stones.

References

The Rolling Stones songs
Songs written by Jagger–Richards
1972 songs
Song recordings produced by Jimmy Miller